Andre Brasil Esteves (born May 23, 1984) is a Paralympic swimmer from Brazil. He had poliomyelitis as a child. He competes in the S10 classification.

He won gold for Brazil at the 2008 Summer Paralympics. He also broke S10 world records in three events, and a Paralympic record in a fourth. He is unbeaten in the men's 400 m freestyle S10 event. He then went on to win and break a world record at the 2012 Summer Paralympics in 50 m freestyle S10, with a time of 23.16 seconds, beating his old record of 23.44 seconds.

, he is S10 world record holder in long course 50, 100 and 200 metre freestyle, 50 and 100 metre butterfly and 50 metre backstroke events.

References

External links

 

Paralympic gold medalists for Brazil
Paralympic silver medalists for Brazil
Paralympic bronze medalists for Brazil
Paralympic swimmers of Brazil
People with polio
1984 births
World record holders in paralympic swimming
Living people
Swimmers at the 2008 Summer Paralympics
Swimmers at the 2012 Summer Paralympics
Swimmers at the 2016 Summer Paralympics
Medalists at the 2008 Summer Paralympics
Medalists at the 2012 Summer Paralympics
Medalists at the 2016 Summer Paralympics
S10-classified Paralympic swimmers
Medalists at the World Para Swimming Championships
Paralympic medalists in swimming
Medalists at the 2011 Parapan American Games
Medalists at the 2015 Parapan American Games
Brazilian male freestyle swimmers
Brazilian male backstroke swimmers
Brazilian male butterfly swimmers
Brazilian male medley swimmers
Swimmers from Rio de Janeiro (city)
21st-century Brazilian people